Parker is a city in Collin County, Texas, United States. The population was 5,462 in 2020.

History
The first settlers arrived in the area that is now Parker in the early 1840s. The town was named after William C. Parker, the son of the area's first known settler, John C. Parker. It was incorporated as a city on March 22, 1969.

Corinth Presbyterian Church was founded in Parker in 1846, with the current sanctuary built in 1923, and is thought to be the oldest continuing congregation in Collin County.

Geography
It is bordered to the north by Allen, to the west by Plano, to the south by Murphy, to the southeast by Wylie, and to the northeast by Lucas.

Parker is the location of the famed Southfork Ranch, the setting used in the television series Dallas.

Demographics

As of the 2020 United States census, there were 5,462 people, 1,250 households, and 1,228 families residing in the city.

Education
A small part of Parker is served by the Allen Independent School District, while the majority is served by the Plano Independent School District.

The portion of Parker in AISD is served by Allen High School. The portion of Parker in PISD is served by Plano East Senior High School.

Notable people
 Patrisha Zobel de Ayala, CEO Emeritus of Ayala Conglomerates and Harvard Medical School alumna
 Anna Kotchneva, gymnast
 Jodie Anne Laubenberg, served in the Texas House of Representatives from 2003 to the present; former member of the Parker City Council
 Nastia Liukin, gymnast, 2008 Olympic Individual All-Around Gold medalist, the 2005 and 2007 World Champion on the balance beam, and the 2005 World Champion on the uneven bars
 Valeri Liukin, gymnast, 1988 Olympic Horizontal Bar gold medalist
 Rich Templeton, CEO of Texas Instruments

References

External links
 City of Parker official website

Dallas–Fort Worth metroplex
Cities in Collin County, Texas
Cities in Texas